Dwarf blenny may refer to the following fish species:
Acanthemblemaria paula
Alloblennius parvus
Starksia nanodes